The Roman Catholic Diocese of Carabayllo is a diocese located in the city of Carabayllo within the ecclesiastical province of Lima in Peru.

History
14 December 1996: Established as Diocese of Carabayllo from the Metropolitan Archdiocese of Lima

Bishops

Ordinaries
 , O.F.M. Cap. (December 14, 1996 - April 20, 2022)
 , O.F.M.  (since April 20, 2022)

Other priest of this diocese who became bishop
 Guillermo Teodoro Elías Millares, auxiliary bishop of the archdiocese of Lima (2019–)

See also
Roman Catholicism in Peru

Sources
 GCatholic.org
 Catholic Hierarchy
  Diocese website

Roman Catholic dioceses in Peru
Roman Catholic Ecclesiastical Province of Lima
Christian organizations established in 1996
Roman Catholic dioceses and prelatures established in the 20th century